Malgium (also Malkum) is an ancient Mesopotamian city identified as Tell Yassir which thrived especially in the Middle Bronze Age, ca. 2000 BC - 1600 BC. Located on the river Tigris, south of where the Diyala River branches off and upstream of Maškan-šapir, it formed a small city-state in an area where the edges of the territories controlled by Larsa, Babylon and Elam converged. Inscribed in cuneiform as ma-al-gi-imKI, its chief deities were Ea and Damkina.

Tell Yassir
The site is a single mound covering around 15 hectares. Iraqi archaeologists conducted a surface survey. The site was heavily looted after the 2003 invasion of Iraq, to the extent that administrative and palatial structures visible from earlier satellite images could no longer be found. Along with pottery shards a number of inscribed bricks were found including those of Ur III rulers (Shulgi and Shu-Suen) and rulers of Malgium
An example brick inscription:

History

Three of its rulers have been identified with certainty, through attestation in their inscriptions as šàr (lugal) ma-al-gi-imki, Takil-ilissu, son of Ištaran-asû, Imgur-Sin, son of Ili-abi, and, probably the last one, Ipiq-Ištar, son of Apil-Ilišu, a contemporary of Ḫammu-rāpi of Babylon, who celebrated conflict with the city in two of his year names (10 and 35). A further three rulers have been proposed, Šu-Kakka, Nabi-Enlil (son of Šu-Kakka) and Šu-Amurrum (son of Nabi-Enlil), three generations of a dynasty, based upon Šu-Kakka’s year name honoring the goddess Damkina and seal impressions. Their absolute position is uncertain but they seem to have reigned from the immediate aftermath of the downfall of the Ur III empire. Cuneiform tablets from the city of Irisaĝrig (now believed to be  the nearby Tell al-Wilayah), now published, show that Malkum conquered that city roughly after year 10 of Ibbi-Sin, the last ruler of the Ur III empire. The tablets also included year names showing that kings Nur-Eštar (previously unknown),  Šu-Kakka,  Nabi-Enlil,  Šu-Amurrum,  Imgur-Sin,  and  Ištaran-asu ruled over Irisaĝrig.

The kings of Larsa targeted Malgium in their pursuit of territorial expansion with Gungunum celebrating its conquest in his 19th year name, circa 1914 BC, Sin-Iddinam its defeat in his 5th year name ca. 1844 and Warad-Sîn commemorated mu ugnim mà-al-gu-umki gištukul ba(-an)-sìg, “Year : the army? of Malgium was smitten by weapons”, ca. 1831 BC. Ḫammu-rāpi, in a grand coalition with Shamshi-Adad I and Ibal-pi-El II (of Eshnunna), campaigned against the city-state until its ruler bought them off with 15 talents of silver. Freed from its vassalage to Elam, by Ḫammu-rāpi’s triumph over them, Malgium’s king, Ipiq-Ištar, concluded a treaty and subsequently provided aid and soldiers in Ḫammu-rāpi’s campaign against Larsa. For as yet uncertain reasons, Ḫammu-rāpi turned on his erstwhile ally and sacked the city ca. 1758, deporting much of its populace to Babylonia. Its state in the Middle Babylonian Period and later periods was much more humble as an administrative district called Malgu and a settlement referred to as Maliki.

See also
Cities of the ancient Near East

References

External links
Tablet from Malgium at CDLI naming ruler Ipiq-Eštar son of Apil-ilīšu

Ancient cities of the Middle East
City-states
Former populated places in Iraq
Archaeological sites in Iraq